Archbishop Blanch School is a Church of England secondary school for girls located in Liverpool, England. The school is named after Baron Stuart Blanch who was Bishop of Liverpool from 1966 to 1975, and Archbishop of York from 1975 to 1983.

It is a voluntary aided school administered by Liverpool City Council and the Anglican Diocese of Liverpool.

History

Grammar schools
Archbishop Blanch School was formed in September 1981 from the amalgamation of two grammar schools, St Edmund's College (a direct grant grammar school) and Liverpool Girls' College.

Comprehensive
In 1993, the school moved from its original site at Sefton Park Road, Toxteth (formerly Liverpool College and then Arundel College) to a site vacated by Paddington Comprehensive School at Mount Vernon, before moving to its current purpose-built site in September 2015. The school was awarded specialist Technology College status in 1995 and became a Training School in 2007.

Curriculum
Archbishop Blanch School offers GCSEs and BTECs as programmes of study for pupils. The school sixth form is part of the Faiths Partnership with fellow member schools Bellerive FCJ Catholic College, St Hilda's Church of England High School and St Margaret's Church of England Academy. Together, the schools offer a range of A-levels and further BTECs.

Ofsted rates the school as 'Good'.

Notable former pupils

St Edmund's College
 Jean Alexander, actress who played Hilda Ogden on Coronation Street
 Kim Cattrall (briefly), actress
 Janice Long, former Radio 1 presenter from 1982 to 2006 and presented Top of the Pops (1966–73)
 Heidi Thomas, screenplay writer who writes the television period drama Call the Midwife; married to Stephen McGann

References

External links
Archbishop Blanch School official website

1981 establishments in England
Church of England secondary schools in the Diocese of Liverpool
Girls' schools in Merseyside
Secondary schools in Liverpool
Training schools in England
Voluntary aided schools in England